Pryke & Palmer Ltd. was a company of ironmongers and builders' merchants, in the City of London, England. Their illustrated and extensive catalogues (a 1 November 1894 edition in Australia's Caroline Simpson Library has 782 pages) have become sought-after by collectors, with some reproduced in facsimile editions.

In 1925 the company's Chairman, William Robert Pryke (1847-1932), served as Lord Mayor of London and was subsequently created a Baronet. His son, Dudley Pryke (1882–1959), later 2nd Baronet, spent his entire life working for the firm, rising to be managing director.

Their catalogues show them as located at 40 & 41, Upper Thames Street, London E.C. 4. They also had premises at Broken Wharf, in the Port of London, nearby. By 1930, they had showrooms on Newman Street/Oxford Street, in central London.

Products 

An idea of the vast range of products made or stocked by Pryke & Palmer can be gleaned from their 807-page "Catalogue of General Hardware", circa 1920, held by the Museum of English Rural Life:

References

External links 

 Blog post with pictures of P&P coal-hole covers

Companies based in the City of London
Ironmongers